Microblade may refer to:

 Microblade technology for the creation and use of small stone blades
 Microblading, a tattooing technique